Vannadil Puthiyaveettil "V. P." Balagangadharan (born 20 January 1950) is a space scientist, author, and speaker from India, known for his contributions to propellant research, technology transfer, and science communication. He has worked with the Indian Space Research Organisation for over four decades in various roles.

Education 
After finishing his schooling at AV Smaraka Govt. Higher Secondary School, Karivellur, and Pre-Degree from Payyanur College, Balagangadharan joined Malabar Christian College, Kozhikode in 1967, from where he completed his Bachelor of Science in Chemistry in 1970. While working at Vikram Sarabhai Space Centre, he completed his Master of Science in Chemistry from Pune University in 1989.

Career 
Balagangadharan started his career as an Analytical Chemist at Bombay Oil Industries, Angamaly in 1971. In 1972, he joined Vikram Sarabhai Space Centre as a Scientific Assistant in its Propellant Engineering Division, later Analytical & Spectroscopy Division. After almost four decades of service, in 2010, he superannuated as the Group Head, Technology Transfer and Documentation Division at the centre. Post superannuation, he held the emeritus role as Prof. Brahm Prakash Scientist—two stints, separated by a one year role as Consultant and Advisor (Media & Communications)—till 2014

He was formerly the Chairman of the Patent Advisory Committee of the Government of Kerala.

Science communication 
He has over 30 research publications in the area of Analytical chemistry. He has delivered over three hundred talks, and shows on All India Radio and Doordarshan. He has lectured across India on India's space history and  Intellectual Property Rights. He has also written many articles in the print media on popular science, space research and IPR.

Books 

 Rockets and Beyond, 2012, Vigyan Prasar
 Mangalyaan:Oru Shastragnante Kurippukal, 2015, Jnaneswari Publications
 From Fishing Hamlet To Red Planet, 2016, HarperCollins
 Indian Bahirakasa Gaveshana Charithram, 2018, DC Books
Chandrayaan-2, 2019, DC Books
Ever Upwards: ISRO in Images, 2019, Orient Blackswan
Panthranduper Chandranil, 2021, Priyatha Books
Kuttikalude Rocket Pusthakam, 2021, Jnaneswari Publications
Vikram Sarabhai Rocketil Oru Jeevitham, 2022, GV Books

Awards and honours 
Kerala State Science Literature Award, 2015, Kerala State Council for Science, Technology and Environment Fellow, Kerala Academy of Sciences

References 

1950 births
Living people
Indian Space Research Organisation people
Scientists from Thiruvananthapuram
Indian scientific authors
Science communicators
People from Kannur district